Cala Fuili is a beach located south along the coast from Cala Gonone, Sardinia.

References

Beaches of Italy